Paloma Rocío Castillo Astorga (born November 11, 1999), known professionally as Paloma Mami, is a Chilean-American singer-songwriter. She began her musical career in 2018, and her first studio album, Sueños de Dalí, was released in March 2021.

Early life 
Paloma Castillo was born in Manhattan, New York, to Jorge Luis Eduardo Castillo Jiménez and Andrea Miriam Astorga Valdivia, both from Doñihue, Chile. She has an older sister, Sofía, who works as a make-up artist. She chose her stage name, Paloma Mami, in high school, inspired by Drake's Instagram username. After her parents separated, Castillo, alongside her mother and sister, moved to Santiago, where she began her musical career.

Career 
Castillo was a participant in the first season of the Chilean talent show, Rojo, el color del talento, on Televisión Nacional de Chile. In July 2018, she entered the competition. However, due to the terms of the contract offered by the channel, Castillo left the show after two appearances.

Castillo independently released the single "Not Steady" with a music video in June 2018. The song was written by Paloma Mami and Lesz. The song mixes styles like dancehall, trap, soul and R&B. On September 2, 2018, she was the opening act for Arcángel at Teatro Caupolicán. The following month, she signed with Sony Music Latin, becoming the first Chilean artist to sign with the label.

Artistry 
Castillo defines her music as Latin R&B and urbano. She incorporates elements of pop and trap. She cites several people as influences, including Bad Bunny, Rihanna, Christina Aguilera, Amy Winehouse, Aaliyah and Ella Fitzgerald.

Discography

Albums 
 Sueños de Dalí (2021)
 RIAA:Gold (Latin)

Singles

Filmography

Awards and nominations 
Paloma has won 6 awards, including Copihue de Oro for Best Urban Music Singer and Giga Award. Overall, she has been nominated for 23 awards, including nominations for the MTV Millennial Awards for Viral Artist, Premios Juventud for The New Urban Generation and Premio Lo Nuestro for Female Urban Artist of the Year.

References 

Living people
Chilean pop singers
21st-century Chilean women singers
American emigrants to Chile
American people of Chilean descent
Naturalized citizens of Chile
Sony Music Latin artists
1999 births
Women in Latin music